Baccio Pontelli (c. 1450 – 1492) was an Italian architect, who designed the Sistine Chapel in The Vatican City. Baccio is an abbreviation of Bartolomeo.

Pontelli was born in Florence. Passing the phase of artistic formation with Giuliano and Benedetto da Maiano in Florence, and influenced by Francesco di Giorgio Martini during the trip to Urbino (1480–1482), he was an in-layer in Florence and later in Urbino. There he worked on the Studio di Federico, Palazzo Ducale.

Acting as an architect in Rome, he participated in the pope Sixtus IV's urban renewal. His projects included: Santa Aurea in Ostia; the Ponte Sisto in Rome; the hospital of Santo Spirito in Sassia; the church Sant'Agostino; the facade of Santa Maria del Popolo; San Pietro in Vincoli; Santi Apostoli and design for the Sistine Chapel. In the last years of his life he worked on the military fortresses of Ostia, Acquaviva Picena Jesi, Osimo and Senigallia. He died in Urbino.

References

15th-century Italian architects
Architects from Florence
Italian Renaissance architects
1450s births
1492 deaths